This is a list of films produced in the Netherlands during the 1920s. The films are produced in the Dutch language.

1920s
Films
Dutch